Robert Egerton Grosvenor, 5th Baron Ebury, DSO (8 February 1914 – 5 May 1957), was a British peer, military officer and racing driver.

Life and family
He was the elder son of Francis Egerton Grosvenor, 4th Baron Ebury, and his wife Mary Adela Glasson, and a member of the extended Grosvenor family headed by the Duke of Westminster. The 1st Baron Ebury had been a younger son of the 1st Marquess of Westminster, and the latter's grandson became the 1st Duke of Westminster in 1874.

He was educated at Harrow School, succeeded his father in the barony in 1932, and served as a Lord-in-waiting (government whip in the House of Lords) under Neville Chamberlain from 1939 to 1940. Lord Ebury served in the Royal Artillery during the Second World War, and he was awarded the DSO for his bravery under fire during the siege at Cassino in 1944.

Lord Ebury married firstly Anne Acland-Troyte, daughter of Herbert Walter Acland-Troyte, in 1933. They had two sons but were divorced in 1941 (she died in 1982). He married secondly the Hon. Denise Margaret Yarde-Buller, daughter of the 3rd Baron Churston, in 1941. They had two sons and two daughters but were divorced in 1954 (she died in 2005). He married thirdly Sheila Winifred Dashfield, daughter of Arthur Edward Dashfield, in 1954. 

A keen racing driver, Lord Ebury died on 5 May 1957 after an accident at Prescott, Gloucestershire, aged 43, while driving a Jaguar C-type. He was cremated at Oxford Crematorium, where there is a plaque to him and his third wife Sheila, who died in 2010.

He was succeeded in the barony by his elder son from his first marriage, Francis, who in 1999 succeeded a kinsman as 8th Earl of Wilton.

The art historian, writer and television presenter Bendor Grosvenor is a grandson of Lord Ebury through the latter's fourth son, the Hon. Richard Alexander Grosvenor (b. 1946).

References

Kidd, Charles, Williamson, David (editors). Debrett's Peerage and Baronetage (1990 edition). New York: St Martin's Press, 1990.

1914 births
1957 deaths
People educated at Harrow School
Barons in the Peerage of the United Kingdom
Robert Grosvenor, 5th Baron Ebury
Racing drivers who died while racing
Sport deaths in England
Companions of the Distinguished Service Order
Royal Artillery officers
British Army personnel of World War II
Ministers in the Chamberlain wartime government, 1939–1940
Ministers in the Chamberlain peacetime government, 1937–1939